Béla Bodonyi (born 14 December 1956) is a Hungarian former footballer who played at both professional and international levels as a striker.

Career
Born in Jászdózsa, Bodonyi played club football in both Hungary and Switzerland for Debrecen, Budapest Honvéd and FC Bulle.

He also earned 27 caps for the Hungarian national team between 1979 and 1985, representing them at the 1982 FIFA World Cup.

References

1956 births
Living people
Hungarian footballers
Hungary international footballers
1982 FIFA World Cup players
Hungarian expatriate footballers
Expatriate footballers in Switzerland
Hungarian expatriate sportspeople in Switzerland
Budapest Honvéd FC players
FC Bulle players
FC Fribourg players
Association football forwards
Swiss Super League players
Sportspeople from Jász-Nagykun-Szolnok County